Jaws Strikes Again is an album by American jazz saxophonist Eddie "Lockjaw" Davis recorded in Paris in 1976 and released on the French Black and Blue label.

Track listing 
 "Don't Worry 'bout Me" (Rube Bloom, Ted Koehler) – 5:38
 "The Man I Love" (George Gershwin, Ira Gershwin) – 5:17
 "Light and Lovely" (Eddie "Lockjaw" Davis) – 8:45
 "Stompin' at the Savoy" (Edgar Sampson, Benny Goodman, Andy Razaf, Chick Webb) – 4:30 	
 "When Sunny Gets Blue" (Marvin Fisher, Jack Segal) – 4:09
 "Blue and Sentimental" (Count Basie, Mack David, Jerry Livingston) – 3:26
 "Jumpin' with Symphony Sid" (Lester Young) – 6:09

Personnel 
 Eddie "Lockjaw" Davis – tenor saxophone
 Wild Bill Davis – organ
 Billy Butler – guitar 
 Oliver Jackson – drums

References 

Eddie "Lockjaw" Davis albums
1976 albums
Black & Blue Records albums